Westerly is a literary magazine that has been produced at the University of Western Australia since 1956. It currently publishes two issues a year, and in 2016 released its first online special issues. The journal maintains a specific focus on the Australian and Asian regions, but has published literary and cultural content from international authors. The magazine publishes fiction, poetry, cultural, autobiographic, and scholarly essays, and interviews.

History 
In 2015, Westerly ran a campaign called 'Word Matters', a response in publication to the funding cuts seen in the arts in federal and state budgets. The campaign published poetry from two young emerging poets, and sought reader engagement in the tweeting of responses online (#westerlywordmatters). Around that time, Westerly developed a more extensive online presence with a new website and social media engagement. The magazine, with the redesign of their website, broadened their publications to include special issues and regular online pieces.

In early 2016, the magazine ran a successful crowdfunding campaign on chuffed.org exceeding their target funding. Funding has also been received from the Copyright Agency Ltd. to support a forthcoming 'Writers Development Program'.

The Westerly archives are housed in Special Collections in the University of Western Australia Library, with a complete digital version of the backset available at the website.

Notable contributors 
Notable Westerly writers include Randolph Stow, Dorothy Hewett, T.A.G. Hungerford and Elizabeth Jolley; highly awarded contemporary writers, including Tim Winton, Kim Scott, and Sally Morgan; and acclaimed local poets John Kinsella, Tracy Ryan, John Mateer, and Lucy Dougan. It has a remit to focus on Western Australian writing, with other interests including the Asia region and Australian literature more generally.

The Patricia Hackett Prize has been awarded by the University of Western Australia for the best original contribution to Westerly each year since 1965.

See also
List of literary magazines

References

Further reading
 Bennett, Bruce [et al.] (1993 Westerly looks to Asia: A selection from Westerly 1956-1992 Nedlands, W.A : Indian Ocean Centre for Peace Studies in association with the Centre for Studies in Australian Literature, University of Western Australia, 1993. Monograph (Indian Ocean Centre for Peace Studies) ; no. 6. 
 Bennett, Bruce and Peter Cowan, eds. (1978) .Westerly 21: An anniversary selection Fremantle (W.A.): Fremantle Arts Centre Press. 
 Bennett, Bruce, (2005) Westerly through the rear-view mirror. (A brief history of the literary magazine). Westerly, Vol. 50 (2005), p. 13-17.

External links
 

1956 establishments in Australia
Literary magazines published in Australia
Biannual magazines published in Australia
History of Western Australia
Magazines established in 1956
Magazines published in Perth, Western Australia
University of Western Australia
Western Australian literature